The Great Frost of 1683–1684 was a frost across England, reported as the worst in its history. The Great Frost enabled one of the River Thames frost fairs. Entertainment on the frozen Thames as result of the Great Frost began the career of Chipperfield's Circus. A Great Frost Fair was also held in Leeds, when the River Aire froze solid for a month allowing a fair with an ox-roast and sports to take place, as described by Ralph Thoresby.

See also: Little Ice Age.

References

External links
 Contemporary reports of the 1683-1684 frost

1683 in England
1684 in England
1683 cold waves
1684 cold waves
Cold waves in the United Kingdom